Tal Alexander (born 5 July 1986) and Oren Alexander are United States real estate agents focusing on the New York and Miami markets. They founded the Alexander Team at Douglas Elliman Real Estate in 2012. In 2019, the brothers co-represented the buyer in the most expensive residential home transaction ever in the United States.

Early life

Tal Alexander played tennis for Hofstra University, and Oren Alexander graduated from the University of Colorado with a BA in finance. They both moved to New York in 2008 to start their careers.

Career

Oren Alexander's first major deal was the sale of an $8.2 million penthouse in Manhattan in 2009.

In 2019, the brothers co-represented the buyer in the United States' most expensive residential home transaction, when a 24,000 square foot penthouse, at 220 Central Park South, sold for $238 million in 2019. This sale surpassed the prior record when Barry Rosenstein paid $137 million for his home in The Hamptons in 2014. Also in 2019, the brothers sold an estate in Miami for $50 million, the most expensive single-family home ever sold in the Miami area.

The brothers' clients include Leon Black, Kim Kardashian and Kanye West, Steve Madden, and Tommy Hilfiger. Oren Alexander has been featured in Forbes 30 Under 30 in Real Estate.

References

1986 births
Living people
American real estate brokers
Year of birth unknown